is a 1950 drama film directed by Yasujirō Ozu and starring Kinuyo Tanaka and Hideko Takamine.

Synopsis
Setsuko is unhappily married to Mimura, an engineer with no job and a bad drinking habit. She had always been in love with Hiroshi but both of them failed to propose when Hiroshi left for France a few years ago. Now he is back and Mariko (Setsuko's sister) tries to reunite them. She too is secretly in love with Hiroshi.

References

External links

Films directed by Yasujirō Ozu
1950s Japanese-language films
1950 films
Films scored by Ichirō Saitō
Films with screenplays by Yasujirō Ozu
Films with screenplays by Kogo Noda
Shintoho films
Japanese drama films
1950 drama films
Japanese black-and-white films
1950s Japanese films